Bayezid I, also known as Bayezid the Thunderbolt (– 8 March 1403), was the Ottoman Sultan from 1389 to 1402. He adopted the title of Sultan-i Rûm, Rûm being an old Islamic name for the culturally Hellenistic Eastern Roman Empire. He decisively defeated the Crusaders at the Battle of Nicopolis in what is now Bulgaria in 1396. Bayezid unsuccessfully besieged Constantinople. He later was defeated and captured by Timur at the Battle of Ankara in 1402 and died in captivity in March 1403, which triggered the Ottoman Interregnum.

Biography

Bayezid was the son of Murad I and his Greek wife, Gülçiçek Hatun. His first major role was as governor of Kütahya, a city that he earned by marrying the daughter of a Germiyanid ruler. He was an impetuous soldier, earning the nickname "Thunderbolt" in a battle against the Karamanids.
 
Bayezid ascended to the throne following the death of his father, Murad I, who was killed by Serbian knight Miloš Obilić during (15 June), or immediately after (16 June), the Battle of Kosovo in 1389, the battle in which Serbia became a vassal of the Ottoman Sultanate. Immediately after obtaining the throne, he had his younger brother strangled to avoid a plot. In 1390, Bayezid took as a wife Princess Olivera Despina, the daughter of Prince Lazar of Serbia, who also lost his life in Kosovo. Bayezid recognized Stefan Lazarević, the son of Lazar, as the new Serbian leader - later despot - with considerable autonomy.

 Upper Serbia resisted the Ottomans until Bayezid captured Skopje in 1391, converting the city into an important base of operations.

Efforts to unify Anatolia

Meanwhile, the sultan began unifying Anatolia under his rule. Forcible expansion into Muslim territories could have endangered the Ottoman relationship with the gazis, who were an important source of warriors for this ruling house on the European frontier. Thus Bayezid began the practice of first securing fatwas, or legal rulings from Islamic scholars, to justify wars against these Muslim states. However, Bayezid suspected the loyalty of his Muslim Turkish followers, so he relied heavily on his Serbian and Byzantine vassal troops in these conquests.

In a single campaign over the summer and fall of 1390, Bayezid conquered the beyliks of Aydin, Saruhan and Menteshe. His major rival Sulayman, the emir of Karaman, responded by allying himself with the ruler of Sivas, Kadi Burhan al-Din and the remaining Turkish beyliks. Nevertheless, Bayezid pushed on and overwhelmed the remaining beyliks (Hamid, Teke, and Germiyan), as well as taking the cities of Akşehir and Niğde, as well as their capital Konya from the Karaman. At this point, Bayezid accepted peace proposals from Karaman (1391), concerned that further advances would antagonize his Turkoman followers and lead them to ally with Kadi Burhan al-Din. Once peace had been made with Karaman, Bayezid moved north against Kastamonu which had given refuge to many fleeing from his forces, and conquered both that city as well as Sinop. However, his subsequent campaign was stopped by Burhan al-Din at the Battle of Kırkdilim.

From 1389 to 1395 he conquered Bulgaria and northern Greece. In 1394 Bayezid crossed the River Danube to attack Wallachia, ruled at that time by Mircea the Elder. The Ottomans were superior in number, but on 10 October 1394 (or 17 May 1395), in the Battle of Rovine, on forested and swampy terrain, the Wallachians won the fierce battle and prevented Bayezid's army from advancing beyond the Danube.

In 1394, Bayezid laid siege to Constantinople, the capital of the Byzantine Empire. Anadoluhisarı fortress was built between 1393 and 1394 as part of preparations for the second Ottoman siege of Constantinople, which took place in 1395. On the urgings of the Byzantine emperor Manuel II Palaeologus, a new crusade was organized to defeat him. This proved unsuccessful: in 1396 the Christian allies, under the leadership of the King of Hungary and future Holy Roman Emperor (in 1433) Sigismund, were defeated in the Battle of Nicopolis. Bayezid built the magnificent Ulu Cami in Bursa, to celebrate this victory.

Thus the siege of Constantinople continued, lasting until 1402. The beleaguered Byzantines had their reprieve when Bayezid fought the Timurid Empire in the east. At this time, the empire of Bayezid included Thrace (except Constantinople), Macedonia, Bulgaria, and parts of Serbia in Europe. In Asia, his domains extended to the Taurus Mountains. His army was considered one of the best in the Islamic world.

Clash with Timur

In 1397, Bayezid defeated the emir of Karaman in Akçay, killing him and annexing his territory. In 1398, the sultan conquered the Djanik emirate and the territory of Burhan al-Din, violating the accord with the Turco-Mongol emir Timur. Finally, Bayezid occupied Elbistan and Malatya.

In 1400, Timur succeeded in rousing the local Turkic beyliks who had been vassals of the Ottomans to join him in his attack on Bayezid, who was also considered one of the most powerful rulers in the Muslim world during that period. Years of insulting letters had passed between Timur and Bayezid. Both rulers insulted each other in their own way while Timur preferred to undermine Bayezid's position as a ruler and play down the significance of his military successes.

This is the excerpt from one of Timur's letters addressed to Ottoman sultan:

In the fateful Battle of Ankara, on 20 July 1402, the Ottoman army was defeated. Bayazid tried to escape, but was captured and taken to Timur. Historians describe their first meeting as follows:

Many writers claim that Bayezid was mistreated by the Timurids. However, writers and historians from Timur's own court reported that Bayezid was treated well, and that Timur even mourned his death. One of Bayezid's sons, Mustafa Çelebi, was captured with him and held captive in Samarkand until 1405.

Four of Bayezid's sons, specifically Süleyman Çelebi, İsa Çelebi, Mehmed Çelebi, and Musa Çelebi, however, escaped from the battlefield and later started a civil war for the Ottoman throne known as the Ottoman Interregnum. After Mehmed's victory, his coronation as Mehmed I, and the deaths of the other three, Bayezid's other son Mustafa Çelebi emerged from hiding and began two failed rebellions against his brother Mehmed and, after Mehmed's death, his nephew Murad II.

Bayezid in captivity 

In Europe, the legend of Bayazid's humiliation in captivity was very popular. He was allegedly chained, and forced to watch how his beloved wife, Olivera, served Timur at dinner. According to a legend, Timur took Bayezid with himself everywhere in a barred palanquin or cage, humiliating him in various ways, used Bayezid as a support under his legs, and at dinner had him placed under the table where bones were thrown at him.

Different versions on Bayezid's death existed, too. One of them mentioned the suicide of Bayezid. Allegedly, the Sultan committed suicide through hitting his head against the bars of his cell or taking poison. The version was promoted by Ottoman historians: Lutfi Pasha, Ashik Pasha-Zade. There was also a version where Bayezid was supposedly poisoned by Timur's order. This is considered unlikely, because there is evidence that the Turkic ruler entrusted the care of Bayezid to his personal doctors.

In the descriptions of contemporaries and witnesses of the events, neither a cell nor humiliation is mentioned.

German traveller and writer Johann Schiltberger did not write anything about the cell, bars or violent death. Another contemporary, Jean II Le Maingre, who witnessed Bayezid's captivity, wrote nothing about the cell or poisoning either. Clavijo, who came to Timur's court in 1404 as part of the embassy and visited Constantinople on his return trip, also did not mention the cell. All Greek sources of the first decade of the 15th century are equally silent about the cell. Sharafaddin Yazdi (? -1454) in Zafar-nama wrote that Bayezid was treated with respect, and at his request, Turco-Mongols found his son among the captives and brought him to his father. Regarding Bayezid's wife, Sharafaddin wrote that Timur sent her and his daughters to her husband. Olivera allegedly became a Muslim under the influence of Timur.

First references to a disrespectful attitude towards Bayazid appear in the works of ibn Arabshah (1389-1450) and Constantine of Ostrovica. Ibn Arabshah wrote that "Bayezid's heart was broken to pieces" when he saw that his wives and concubines were serving at a banquet.

Ibn Arabshah wrote the following about the captivity of Bayezid:

However, this is just a "flowery style", and not a real cell. According to literary historian H.A.R. Gibb, "the flowery elegance of style has also affected historiography. Most of the authors of the Timurid era succumbed to its influence ."

Constantine of Ostrovica wrote neither about the cell, nor about the nudity of Bayezid's wife; though he did write that Bayezid committed suicide. In the story of Constantine, just like in that of ibn Arabshah, the sultan was so struck by the fact that his wife carried wine to a feast that he poisoned himself with a poison from his ring.

Ottoman historian Mehmed Neshri (1450-1520) described Bayezid's imprisonment and mentioned the cell twice. According to him, Timur asked Bayezid what he would do in Timur's place with regard to the captive. "I would have planted him in an iron cage," Bayezid answered. To which Timur replied: "This is a bad answer." He ordered to prepare the cage and the Sultan was put into it.

The complete set of legends may perhaps be found in the work of Pope Pius II Asiae Europaeque elegantissima descriptio, written in 1450-1460 (published in 1509): Bayezid is kept in a cage, fed with garbage under the table, Timur uses Bayezid as a support to get on or off a horse. Further development can be found in later authors, such as Theodore Spandounes. The first version of his story was written in Italian and completed in 1509, and a French translation was published in 1519. In these versions of the text, Spandounes wrote only about the golden chains and that the sultan was used as a stand. Spandounes added the cell only in later versions of the text. Later versions of the text also include a description of the public humiliation of Bayezid's wife:

Family

Consorts
Bayezid I had at least six consorts:
Devlet Hatun (? - January 1414). Slave concubine, mother of Mehmed I. 
Devletşah Sultan Hatun. Daughter of Süleyman of Germiyan and Mutahhare Abide Hatun, granddaughter of Rumi. 
Maria Olivera Despina Hatun (1372 - after 1444). Serbian princess, daughter of Prince Lazar of Serbia and Princess Miliza, she married Bayezid in 1390. Extremely unpopular with the Ottomans, she was accused of bribing the sultan and introducing alcohol to the court. She was captured by Timur together with her husband, and forced to serve him naked.
Hafsa Hatun. Daughter of Prince Fahreddin Isa Bey of the Aydinids, she married Bayezid in 1390. 
Fülane Hatun. Daughter of Constantine of Kostendil. Her older sister married Murad I and an other her sister married Yakub Çelebi, son of Murad and half-brother of Bayezid. 
 A daughter of John V Palaiologos and Helena Kantakouzene. Her older sister Maria married Murad I and an other her sister married Yakub Çelebi.

Sons
Bayezid I had at least eight sons: 
 Ertuğrul Çelebi; (1378 – 1400). 
 Süleyman Çelebi (d. 1411). Sultan of Rumelia, claimant to the Ottoman throne (r. 1402–1411). 
 İsa Çelebi (d. 1403) - with Devletşah Hatun. Governor of Anatolia, claimant to the Ottoman throne (r. 1403).
 Mehmed I (1382 – 1421) - with Devlet Hatun. Governor of Anatolia, and later Ottoman  Sultan.
 Musa Çelebi (1388 – 1413) - with Devletşah Hatun. Sultan of Rumelia (1410–1413), claimant to the Ottoman throne (1406-1413). 
 Mustafa Çelebi (1393 – 1422). Sultan of Rumelia, claimant to the Ottoman throne (reign 1419–1422). 
 Yusuf Çelebi. Converted to Christianity, changed his name to Demetrios.
 Kasım Çelebi. Sent as a hostage to Constantinople together with his sister, Fatma Hatun.

Daughters
Bayezid I had at least five daughters:
 Hündi Hatun (1388 — 1430). She married to Seyyid Şemseddin Mehmed Buhari Emir Sultan.
 Erhundi Hatun. She married to Yakup Bey, son of Pars Bey.
 Fatma Hatun (1393 — 1417). She was sent as a hostage to Constantinople together with her brother, Kasim Çelebi. Later she married a sanjak-bey in 1413. 
 Öruz Hatun - with Despina Hatun. She married Abu Bakar Mirza, son of Jalal ud-din Miran Shah, son of Timur. They had at least a daughter, Ayşe Hatun. 
 Paşa Melek Hatun - with Despina Hatun. In 1403 she married Emîr Celaluddîn İslâm, a Timur's general.

Personality
According to the British orientalist, Lord Kinross, Bayezid was distinguished by haste, impulsivity, unpredictability and imprudence. He cared little for state affairs, which he entrusted to his governors. As Kinross writes, between campaigns Bayezid was often engaged in pleasures: gluttony, drunkenness and debauchery. The courtyard of the sultan was famous for its luxury and was comparable to the Byzantine court during its heyday.

At the same time, the sultan was a talented commander. In all 13 years of his reign, Bayezid suffered only one defeat, which eventually turned out to be fatal for him. Despite his lust for earthly pleasures, Bayezid was a religious man and used to spend hours in his personal mosque in Bursa. He also kept Islamic theologians in his circle.

In the words of the Contemporary Greek historian Doukas, Bayezid was:

Evaluation of rule
Bayezid managed to expand the territory of his empire to the Danube and the Euphrates. However, Sultan's policy led to a humiliating defeat at Ankara and to the collapse of his state. The Ottoman Empire declined to the size of a beylik from the time of Orhan, but even that territory was divided by Timur and given to the two sons of Bayezid. Small beyliks gained independence again thanks to Timur, who wanted to conquer China in the last years of his life, and therefore did not complete the defeat of the Ottomans. The victory at Ankara marked the beginning of the Ottoman interregnum, which lasted 10 years.

In fiction

The defeat of Bayezid became a popular subject for later Western writers, composers, and painters. They embellished the legend that he was taken by Timur to Samarkand with a cast of characters to create an oriental fantasy that has maintained its appeal. Christopher Marlowe's play Tamburlaine the Great was first performed in London in 1587, three years after the formal opening of English-Ottoman trade relations when William Harborne sailed for Constantinople as an agent of the Levant Company.

In 1648, the play Le Gran Tamerlan et Bejezet by Jean Magnon appeared in London, and in 1725, Handel's Tamerlano was first performed and published in London; Vivaldi's version of the story, Bajazet, was written in 1735. Magnon had given Bayezid an intriguing wife and daughter; the Handel and Vivaldi renditions included, as well as Tamerlane and Bayezid and his daughter, a prince of Byzantium and a princess of Trebizond (Trabzon) in a passionate love story. A cycle of paintings in Schloss Eggenberg, near Graz in Austria, translated the theme to a different medium; this was completed in the 1670s shortly before the Ottoman army attacked the Habsburgs in central Europe.

The historical novel The Grand Cham (1921) by Harold Lamb focuses on the quest of its European hero to gain the assistance of Tamerlane in defeating Bayezid. Bayezid (spelled Bayazid) is a central character in the Robert E. Howard story Lord of Samarcand, where he commits suicide at Tamerlane's victory banquet. Bayazid is a main character in the novel The Walls of Byzantium (2013) by James Heneage.

In popular culture
Sultan Bayezid was portrayed in the Serbian 1989 historical drama film Battle of Kosovo, as a participant of the Battle of Kosovo by actor Branislav Lečić, and in the Romanian historical drama Mircea (Proud heritage) by Ion Ritiu as a young Sultan who fought in the battles of Rovine, Nicopolis and Angora.

See also
Amir Sultan

References

Notes

Sources
 
 Harris, Jonathan (2010) The End of Byzantium. New Haven and London: Yale University Press 
 
 
 Nicolle, David (1999) Nicopolis 1396: The Last Crusade. Oxford: Osprey Books

External links

 Yıldırım Bayezid I

1361 births
1403 deaths
14th-century Ottoman sultans
15th-century Ottoman sultans
People of the Bulgarian–Ottoman wars
Monarchs taken prisoner in wartime
Muslims of the Battle of Nicopolis
Ottoman people of the Byzantine–Ottoman wars
Ottoman sultans born to Greek mothers
Turkish poets